Bojsno is a village in the Municipality of Brežice in eastern Slovenia. The area is part of the traditional region of Styria. It is now included in the Lower Sava Statistical Region. The settlement includes the hamlets of Spodnje Bojsno, Zgornje Bojsno, Pesjak, Makovce, and Vogence.

References

External links
Bojsno on Geopedia

Populated places in the Municipality of Brežice